Second Set is a live album by pianist Cedar Walton recorded in Denmark in 1977 and released on the Danish SteepleChase label.

Reception

Allmusic awarded the album 3 stars stating "Eclectic but solidly grounded post-bop pianist Cedar Walton leads his strong quartet through a varied second set of the evening showcasing his fine players as they settle in and groove". The Penguin Guide to Jazz praised and highlighted Berg's performance on "Blue Train".

Track listing 
All compositions by Cedar Walton except where noted.
 "Blue Train" (John Coltrane) - 9:00    
 "I Didn't Know What Time It Was" (Lorenz Hart, Richard Rodgers) - 13:02    
 "The Sunday Suite" - 19:30    
 "The Theme" (Miles Davis) - 1:05

Personnel 
Cedar Walton - piano 
Bob Berg - tenor saxophone
Sam Jones - bass
Billy Higgins - drums

References 

Cedar Walton live albums
1979 live albums
SteepleChase Records live albums
Albums recorded at Jazzhus Montmartre